Rebeldes – Ao vivo is the first live album by Brazilian pop group Rebeldes, officially launched on April 11, 2012, throughout the country. The album also accompanies the release of the band's first DVD, with the same title.

Recorded in the Espaço das Américas, in São Paulo, the DVD is part of the band's first tour. The show brings the main successes of the group, such as "Rebelde para Sempre", "Do Jeito Que Eu Sou", "Quando Estou do Seu Lado", "O Amor Está em Jogo" and "Como um Rockstar". In all, the CD and DVD Rebeldes - Ao vivo sold around 140,000 copies in Brazil. The CD sold approximately 60,000 copies and was awarded with a gold disc, and the DVD sold approximately 80,000 copies and was awarded with a platinum disc. The album Rebeldes - Ao vivo was the 32nd best selling album in Brazil in 2012. This was a modest number for the band, but the DVD became EMI Music Brasil's best seller and was one of the best sellers of the year of 2012.

"Nada Pode Nos Parar" was released as an exclusive song and is featured as a bonus and exclusively on the album. The promotional single obtained a great commercial success, reaching the 1st position in Brazil Hot Pop and the 2nd position in Brazil Hot 100 Airplay.

Background
The DVD was recorded from the tour Rebeldes Teen Festival. The show was recorded in two days; the first was the recording of the album and the second of the DVD. In the show each one of the six components of the band makes a cover for the section "DJ Party": Sophia Abrahão sings "Born This Way" by Lady Gaga; Chay Suede sings "Last Nite" by the band The Strokes; Lua Blanco sings "Firework" by Katy Perry; Arthur Aguiar sings "Toda Forma de Amor" by Lulu Santos; and Mel Fronckowiak sings "Loca" by Shakira. The only member of the band who does not sing a cover song is Micael Borges. He does an original rap called "Rap Rebeldes".

Tracks

CD

DVD

References

2012 live albums
Live albums by Brazilian artists
Portuguese-language video albums
Portuguese-language live albums
Albums produced by Rick Bonadio
Live video albums
2012 video albums